Aura Seaways is a RoPax ferry operated by DFDS Seaways on their Klaipėda–Karlshamn route in the Baltic region. She is the first of a new class of Ropax ferries intended to operate the Baltic route with her sister ship Luna Seaways expected to join her in spring 2022. The ferry was assembled at Guangzhou Shipyard International and is currently the largest RoPax in the company's fleet. The completion of Aura Seaways also mark the first newbuilt passenger vessel contracted by DFDS in nearly 40 years.

History
Aura Seaways and her sister ship were ordered in 2018 as part of a service expansion by DFDS, in order to increase capacity on their growing baltic sea network. Currently, the routes between Klaipėda and Karlshamn are served by primarily cargo-based RoRo ferries providing limited passenger transport capabilities. The introduction of Aura Seaways enabled the combination of both passenger and freight networks, while providing an additional 30% of lane metres capacity on the route. Aura Seaways operates the Klaipėda-Karlshamn route with the option of potentially expanding operations to also provide service on the Klaipėda–Kiel route by late 2022 once joined by her sister ship.

References 

2020 ships
DFDS